The Strei is a left tributary of the river Mureș in Transylvania, Romania. The upper reach of the river, upstream of the village of Baru, is also known as Râul Petros. It flows through the town Călan and the villages Petros, Baru, Livadia, Pui, Galați, Băiești, Ohaba de sub Piatră, Ciopeia, Subcetate, Covragiu, Bretea Română, Bretea Streiului, Ruși, Strei, Streisângeorgiu, Batiz, Băcia and Simeria Veche. It discharges into the Mureș near Simeria.

Tributaries
The following rivers are tributaries to the river Strei (from source to mouth):

Left: Sasu, Jigureasa, Jiguroșița, Crivadia, Bărușor, Valea Verde, Bărbat, Rușor, Râul Alb, Paroș, Sălaș, Râul Mare, Silvaș, Valea Râpelor, Nădăștia, Sâncrai
Right: Ohaba, Văratec, Valea Mare, Valea Tiliilor, Gânțaga, Valea Voinii, Valea Luncanilor, Săcel, Valea Făgetului

See also
 Decebalus Treasure

References

 
Rivers of Romania
Rivers of Hunedoara County